Azelia is a genus of flies belonging to the family Muscidae.

Species
Azelia aterrima (Meigen, 1826)
Azelia cilipes (Haliday, 1838)
Azelia fasciata (Emden, 1951)
Azelia gibbera (Meigen, 1826)
Azelia monodactyla Loew, 1874
Azelia nebulosa Robineau-Desvoidy, 1830
Azelia neotropica Snyder, 1957
Azelia parva Rondani, 1866
Azelia plumitibia Feng, Fan & Zeng, 1999
Azelia spinosa Vikhrev, 2015
Azelia triquetra (Wiedemann, 1817)
Azelia unguigera Vikhrev, 2015
Azelia zetterstedtii Rondani, 1866

References

Muscidae
Taxa named by Jean-Baptiste Robineau-Desvoidy
Diptera of North America
Diptera of South America
Diptera of Europe
Diptera of Asia